Kentucky Route 627 (KY 627) is a  north–south state highway in east-central Kentucky. It traverses portions of northern Madison, Clark, and southern Bourbon counties.

Route description 
KY 627 begins in northern Madison County at the concurrently running part of highways U.S. Route 25 and U.S. Route 421 (US 25/US 421) north of Richmond. Just east of that is an interchange with Interstate 75 (I-75). The state highway continues northward to pass near Fort Boonesborough State Park (KY 388 provides access to that destination) and enters Clark County.

KY 627 arrives at Winchester, where it crosses US 60, and later I-64. The state highway goes further north to enter Bourbon County and into the city of Paris, where it terminates in downtown at a junction with a one-way couplet in US 68 Business.

History 

The routing of KY 627 from near Fort Boonesborough to Paris, along with much of KY 388 in Madison County was originally part of US 227 when it existed from 1928 until the U.S. Route's 1972 decommissioning. The KY 627 designation was assigned by the Kentucky Department of Highways the same year as the decommissioning of US 227.

Major intersections

Kentucky Route 627 Truck 

Kentucky Route 627 Truck (KY 627 Truck) is a  truck route of KY 627 around Winchester. It follows KY 1958 (Winchester Bypass) on the west side of town, and I-64 between exits 94 and 96 on the north side of town.

Major intersections

References

External links

Kentucky Transportation Cabinet - Division of Planning

0627
0627
0627
0627